Embu County is a county of Kenya. The capital of Embu County and the former Eastern province headquarters, Embu is a large and largely metropolitan area with a population of 608,599 persons. The county borders Kirinyaga to the west, Kitui to the east, Tharaka Nithi to the north, Machakos to the south.
The county occupies an area of 2,821 km2.

Administrative and political units
The county is divided into 5 sub-counties, with a total of 20 county assembly wards, 51 locations and 127 locations.

Source

Administrative divisions

Administrative Subdivision
Embu County is divided into five districts; namely, Embu West with headquarters at Embu town, and Embu North with headquarters at Manyatta. These two form Manyatta constituency, Embu East with headquarters at Runyenjes, Mbeere North with headquarters at Siakago, and Mbeere South with headquarters at Kiritiri market.

The term "Sub County" is envisaged in the County Governments' context where it is synonymous to "Constituencies" and not just administrative areas.

Political Units

Embu County has four parliamentary constituencies, namely Runyenjes, Manyatta, Mbeere North and Mbeere South.

Political Leadership 
The governor is Martin Nyaga Wambora since 2013 and is serving his last term in office after being re-elected in office for second term in 2017 and is deputised by David Kariuki Njeru. Martin Nyaga Wambora survived two impeachment attempts in his first term as the governor. Peter Njeru Ndwiga the senator and Jane Wanjuki Njiru the women representative with both of them starting office in 2017.

Demographics

Local people are mostly of the Embu, Kamba and Mbeere ethnicities. The Embu are found in Manyatta and Runyenjes constituencies while the Kamba and Mbeere are mostly found in Mbeere North and Mbeere South constituencies with the former mainly found in Mbeere South.

Embu county has a total population of 608,599 persons of which 304,208 are males, 304,367 females and 24 intersex persons and has an average size of 3.3 persons per household.

Projected Population Distribution and Density

*Demarcated as a special area to ensure complete coverage during census enumeration

Source

Physical and Natural Conditions

Physical and Topographic Features
Embu County slopes from North-West towards East and South-East with a few isolated hills such as Kiambere, Kianjiru and Kiang'ombe which rise above the general height and slope.
The county is characterised by highlands and lowlands. It rises from about 515m above sea level at the Tana river basin in the East to over 4,570m above sea in the North West which is part of Mt. Kenya.
Embu County is served by six major rivers;for of them, Thũci, Tana, Kiĩ and Rũvingasĩ which form part of the Embu County's boundaries. The other two rivers are Thiba and Ĩna. All these rivers are perennial.
Between Embu town and Thũci river lies an area with an altitude ranging from 910m to 1,525m above sea level.
The southern part of the county is covered by Mwea plains. It then rises Northwards, culminating in hills and valleys to the Northern and Eastern parts.

Climatic Conditions
Rain received in the county is largely depended on the altitude ranging as 640mm to as high as 1,495 mm per annum. It has a mean temperature of 21oC. with July being the coldest with minimum of 12oC and March hitting highest temperatures of 31c.

Services and Urbanisation

Infrastructure and Access

Roads and Airstrips
The county has extensive road network of 2,213.1 km of which 167.1 km is covered in bitumen and 2046 km is just earth.

There are two airstrips in the county, one meant security purposes is located at Don Bosco in Embu town and the other airstrip in Kiambere is used by KENGEN.

Posts and Telecommunications
The posts and telecommunications sector is well developed in Embu County. It has two post offices at Embu and Runyenjes and 13 sub-post offices in major trading centres.

Embu County also has a 98% mobile network coverage.

Source

Education and ICT

County has a total of 619 ECD centres of which 399 private and 220 public and has total enrolment of 20580 pupils. There are 552 primary schools of which 384 are public and 168 being private schools and has an enrolment of 122710 pupils.

The county was the first to employ early childhood development education teachers in Kenya.
Since January 2014, 483 ECDE teachers were employed.There was opening of 10 youth polytechnics: Mutuobare, Mbonzuki, Makawani, Kiamuringa, Munyori, Makima, Kibugu, Kamutu, Muvandori, and Kavutiri.
There was also procurement of state of the art equipment of the 32 youth polytechnics in the county.
Education Bursary for the needy County students in secondary schools, youth polytechnics, tertiary institutions and universities.
The county has advertised for land on which to build youth polytechnics in Nembure, Gitare, Gatumbi and Kithimu.
The county is in its final stages of connecting all sub-county headquarters with fibre optic connectivity and putting up digital villages and hot spots. This will largely boost the economy of Embu County by opening up the Local and International markets for all stakeholders especially for farmers to sell their produce online.

Health

The county has a health infrastructure consisting of both public and private facilities. It is the host to Embu Provincial General Hospital and three district hospitals; Runyenjes, Siakago and Ishiara. There are also a large number of smaller health facilities across the county.
The main aim of health sector is to create an enabling environment for the provision of sustainable quality health care that is affordable and accessible to the residents. The sector comprises Medical Services, Public Health and Sanitation, Research and Development sub-sectors.
Embu County has adhered to the Ministry of Health policy by providing subsidized services, which are affordable to the community. There exists a waiver/ exemption system for those who cannot afford minimized user fees.
To Improve access and utilization of health services, the county has opened more dispensaries and health centers as a way of rolling out more services to the community. Upgrading the existing facilities to offer expanded services has been in the forefront to meet community needs. Collaborating with other partners to offer more and affordable Health services has been inevitable.
Early 2014 the county distributed drugs to all health centers in the county and purchased ambulances to aid the community to easily access health services.

Source

Economy

Agriculture

Agriculture is the backbone and livelihood of the people of Embu County. The sector employs 70.1 per cent of the population and 87.9 per cent of the households are engaged in Agricultural activities. The upper part of Embu County relies mainly on cash crops such as coffee and tea while the lower part mainly produces cash crops such as miraa(khat) and food crops such as maize, beans, cow peas, bananas, sorghum, tomatoes, pawpaw, avocado and citrus fruits.

The total acreage under food crops is about 14,000 ha compared to the total acreage under cash crops of 19'000 ha. The County heavily relies on Agriculture as the source of livelihood for its people and also as the main economic activity.

Livestock farming is gaining popularity with the revival of milk cooperatives and investment by private sector on milk processing plants. Dairy farming is concentrated in the upper parts of the county while in the lower parts indigenous breeds are reared. The main types of animals reared include cattle, goats, sheep and chicken. Rabbit rearing has also become an attractive venture to the farmers.

The main types of fish in the County include; trout, tilapia, mud fish and cat fish which are available mostly in the hydroelectric dams. The government through the Economic Stimulus Program has constructed 200 fish ponds in each of the four constituencies and the fish harvested is usually sold locally. The Ministry of Fisheries Development has not only supervised the construction of fish pond but also supplied fish food and fish fingerlings to the farmers.

Tourism

Tourism is a key sub-sector that has a high potential in the county for both local and international tourists. Some of the available sites include caves, waterfalls and rocky hills for rock climbers.
The county is also a gateway to Mt. Kenya which, if aggressively marketed can bring huge incomes to the county.
The county is also a host to a number of hydro-electric power dams which are a source of tourist attraction for both local and international tourists. The major dams that generate hydroelectric power for the Country are partly in Embu County. These dams include Kiambere, Gitaru, Kindaruma and Masinga all of which are situated along the Tana River.

Two National reserves namely; Mwea and Mt. Kenya that are managed by KWS have great potential for the tourism industry in the county. Other potential tourist attractions include the Nthenge Njeru water falls near Kirimiri.
There are a variety of wildlife species such as elephants, buffaloes, lions, bush bulks, baboons, hippos, columbus monkeys and numerous species of birds.

Investment

Challenges
One of the major challenges in Embu County has been the road network which is currently under construction. 
Major ring-roads connecting major towns are being graded for tarmacking. While other small figure roads have been graded and are being fitted with murram.
Access to water for domestic purposes and farming has been a great challenge. However, Embu County has initiated a program dubbed 'Water for Children' which is set to ensure all public institutions i.e. schools, health institutions, bus parks, markets etc. have access to clean water.
Already, through this project 6,000 new domestic connections have been made. In addition, through the Ministry of Agriculture in Embu County, new irrigation projects have been started especially drip irrigation which has boosted Agricultural produce in the county.
Such irrigation projects are in Mbeere South and Mbeere North constituencies which are the semi-arid areas in Embu County.

Opportunities
Embu County is naturally endowed with plenty of land. It slopes on the Eastern side of Mt.Kenya which is less steep which makes it ideal for fast climbing of Mt. Kenya. It is also ideal for people with disabilities.
Five of the seven forks dams are in Embu County and they have been sighted as ideal for water sports such as kayaking.
3,000 acres of land have been set aside for putting up of an industrial park in Machang'a Mbeere South Constituency while Manyatta Constituency will host the Small Medium Enterprise (SME) park.
Embu City is in its initial stages of design and construction.
Embu County is setting up a talent academy in Embu city and a high altitude training camp in Kigari, Manyatta constituency.
Embu County is known for macadamia owing to the fact that it is the largest producer of macadamia in the African Great Lakes. Therefore, the county is putting up a macadamia factory in Manyatta constituency for value addition on the product.

Embu County plans to put up tented camps in Mwea National Reserve. Climbing Mt. Kenya through Embu is easier and faster since the route is less steep therefore the County plans to put up some lodges near this route for Mountain climbers.
The county is looking into partnering with investors to put up a planetarium in the area.

See also
Kirinyaga County
Kitui County
Machakos County
Meru County
Muranga County
Tharaka Nithi County

References

External links

Research findings - Embu District

 
Counties of Kenya